The 2008 Stanford Cardinal baseball team represented Stanford University in the 2008 NCAA Division I baseball season. The Cardinal played their home games at Sunken Diamond. The team was coached by Mark Marquess in his 32nd year at Stanford.

The Cardinal won the Palo Alto Regional and the Fullerton Super Regional to advanced to the College World Series, where they were defeated by the Georgia Bulldogs.

Roster

Schedule 

! style="" | Regular Season
|- valign="top" 

|- align="center" bgcolor="#ccffcc
| 1 || February 22 || Nebraska || Sunken Diamond • Stanford, California || 17–1 || 1–0 || –
|- align="center" bgcolor="#ffcccc"
| 2 || February 22 || Nebraska || Sunken Diamond • Stanford, California || 2–9 || 1–1 || –
|- align="center" bgcolor="#ccffcc"
| 3 || February 24 || Nebraska || Sunken Diamond • Stanford, California || 4–2 || 2–1 || –
|- align="center" bgcolor="#ffcccc"
| 4 || February 25 ||  || Sunken Diamond • Stanford, California || 2–4 || 2–2 || –
|- align="center" bgcolor="#ccffcc"
| 5 || February 26 ||  || Sunken Diamond • Stanford, California || 4–3 || 3–2 || –
|- align="center" bgcolor="#ccffcc
| 6 || February 28 ||  || Sunken Diamond • Stanford, California || 12–5 || 4–2 || –
|-

|- align="center" bgcolor="#ccffcc"
| 7 || March 1 || Cal State Fullerton || Sunken Diamond • Stanford, California || 11–7 || 5–2 || –
|- align="center" bgcolor="#ccffcc"
| 8 || March 2 || Cal State Fullerton || Sunken Diamond • Stanford, California || 6–5 || 6–2 || –
|- align="center" bgcolor="#ffcccc"
| 9 || March 4 || at  || Evans Diamond • Berkeley, California || 3–8 || 6–3 || –
|- align="center" bgcolor="#fffdd0"
| 10 || March 5 || at Saint Mary's || Louis Guisto Field • Moraga, California || 7–7 || 6–3–1 || –
|- align="center" bgcolor="#ffcccc"
| 11 || March 7 || at  || UFCU Disch–Falk Field • Austin, Texas || 2–5 || 6–4–1 || –
|- align="center" bgcolor="#ccffcc"
| 12 || March 8 || at Texas || UFCU Disch–Falk Field • Austin, Texas || 6–5 || 7–4–1 || –
|- align="center" bgcolor="#ccffcc"
| 13 || March 9 || at Texas || UFCU Disch–Falk Field • Austin, Texas || 12–9 || 8–4–1 || –
|- align="center" bgcolor="#ffcccc"
| 14 || March 21 ||  || Sunken Diamond • Stanford, California || 6–10 || 8–5–1 || –
|- align="center" bgcolor="#ccffcc"
| 15 || March 22 || at Pacific || Klein Family Field • Stockton, California || 7–3 || 9–5–1 || –
|- align="center" bgcolor="#ccffcc"
| 16 || March 24 || at Pacific || Klein Family Field • Stockton, California || 14–0 || 10–5–1 || –
|- align="center" bgcolor="#ffcccc"
| 17 || March 25 || at  || John Smith Field • Sacramento, California || 3–5 || 10–6–1 || –
|- align="center" bgcolor="#ffcccc"
| 18 || March 28 ||  || Sunken Diamond • Stanford, California || 4–10 || 10–7–1 || 0–1
|- align="center" bgcolor="#ccffcc"
| 19 || March 29 || Washington State || Sunken Diamond • Stanford, California || 7–3 || 11–7–1 || 1–1
|- align="center" bgcolor="#ccffcc"
| 20 || March 30 || Washington State || Sunken Diamond • Stanford, California || 8–2 || 12–7–1 || 2–1
|- align="center" bgcolor="#ccffcc"
| 21 || March 31 ||  || Sunken Diamond • Stanford, California || 9–3 || 13–7–1 || 2–1
|-

|- align="center" bgcolor="#ffcccc"
| 22 || April 1 ||  || Sunken Diamond • Stanford, California || 2–5 || 13–8–1 || 2–1
|- align="center" bgcolor="#ffcccc"
| 23 || April 4 ||  || Sunken Diamond • Stanford, California || 4–6 || 13–9–1 || 2–2
|- align="center" bgcolor="#ccffcc"
| 24 || April 5 || Arizona State || Sunken Diamond • Stanford, California || 12–2 || 14–9–1 || 3–2
|- align="center" bgcolor="#ccffcc"
| 25 || April 6 || Arizona State || Sunken Diamond • Stanford, California || 10–2 || 15–9–1 || 4–2
|- align="center" bgcolor="#fffdd0"
| 26 || April 7 || at California || Evans Diamond • Berkeley, California || 5–5 || 15–9–2 || 4–2
|- align="center" bgcolor="#ffcccc"
| 27 || April 9 ||  || Sunken Diamond • Stanford, California || 8–9 || 15–10–2 || 4–2
|- align="center" bgcolor="#ffcccc"
| 28 || April 11 || at  || Goss Stadium at Coleman Field • Corvallis, Oregon || 9–10 || 15–11–2 || 4–3
|- align="center" bgcolor="#ccffcc"
| 29 || April 12 || at Oregon State || Goss Stadium at Coleman Field • Corvallis, Oregon || 6–4 || 16–11–2 || 5–3
|- align="center" bgcolor="#ccffcc"
| 30 || April 13 || at Oregon State || Goss Stadium at Coleman Field • Corvallis, Oregon || 4–2 || 17–11–2 || 6–3
|- align="center" bgcolor="#ccffcc"
| 31 || April 14 ||  || Stephen Schott Stadium • Santa Clara, California || 3–1 || 18–11–2 || 6–3
|- align="center" bgcolor="#ccffcc"
| 32 || April 16 ||  || Sunken Diamond • Stanford, California || 11–10 || 19–11–2 || 6–3
|- align="center" bgcolor="#ccffcc"
| 33 || April 18 || at UCLA || Jackie Robinson Stadium • Los Angeles, California || 4–1 || 20–11–2 || 7–3
|- align="center" bgcolor="#ccffcc"
| 34 || April 19 || at UCLA || Jackie Robinson Stadium • Los Angeles, California || 6–1 || 21–11–2 || 8–3
|- align="center" bgcolor="#ffcccc"
| 35 || April 20 || at UCLA || Jackie Robinson Stadium • Los Angeles, California || 2–8 || 21–12–2 || 8–4
|- align="center" bgcolor="#ccffcc"
| 36 || April 21 || at Santa Clara || Stephen Schott Stadium • Santa Clara, California || 13–6 || 22–12–2 || 8–4
|- align="center" bgcolor="#ccffcc"
| 37 || April 23 || Saint Mary's || Sunken Diamond • Stanford, California || 7–4 || 23–12–2 || 8–4
|- align="center" bgcolor="#ccffcc"
| 38 || April 25 ||  || Sunken Diamond • Stanford, California || 4–0 || 24–12–2 || 9–4
|- align="center" bgcolor="#ccffcc"
| 39 || April 26 || Southern California || Sunken Diamond • Stanford, California || 26–5 || 25–12–2 || 10–4
|- align="center" bgcolor="#ffcccc"
| 40 || April 27 || Southern California || Sunken Diamond • Stanford, California || 9–10 || 25–13–2 || 10–5
|- align="center" bgcolor="#ffcccc"
| 41 || April 28 || at Santa Clara || Stephen Schott Stadium • Santa Clara, California || 9–10 || 25–14–2 || 10–5
|- align="center" bgcolor="#ffcccc"
| 42 || April 30 || at UC Davis || Dobbins Stadium • Davis, California || 8–10 || 25–15–2 || 10–5
|-

|- align="center" bgcolor="#ccffcc"
| 43 || May 3 ||  || Sunken Diamond • Stanford, California || 9–1 || 26–15–2 || 10–5
|- align="center" bgcolor="#ccffcc"
| 44 || May 4 || at San Jose State || San Jose Municipal Stadium • San Jose, California || 17–6 || 27–15–2 || 10–5
|- align="center" bgcolor="#ccffcc"
| 45 || May 5 || Pacific || Sunken Diamond • Stanford, California || 7–2 || 28–15–2 || 10–5
|- align="center" bgcolor="#ffcccc"
| 46 || May 6 || at San Francisco || Dante Benedetti Diamond at Max Ulrich Field • San Francisco, California || 9–13 || 28–16–2 || 10–5
|- align="center" bgcolor="#ffcccc"
| 47 || May 9 || California || Sunken Diamond • Stanford, California || 3–4 || 28–17–2 || 10–6
|- align="center" bgcolor="#ffcccc"
| 48 || May 10 || California || Sunken Diamond • Stanford, California || 2–5 || 28–18–2 || 10–7
|- align="center" bgcolor="#ccffcc"
| 49 || May 11 || California || Sunken Diamond • Stanford, California || 8–5 || 29–18–2 || 11–7
|- align="center" bgcolor="#ccffcc"
| 50 || May 12 || Santa Clara || Sunken Diamond • Stanford, California || 15–4 || 30–18–2 || 11–7
|- align="center" bgcolor="#ffcccc"
| 51 || May 17 || at Arizona || Jerry Kindall Field at Frank Sancet Stadium • Tucson, Arizona || 6–9 || 30–19–2 || 11–8
|- align="center" bgcolor="#ccffcc"
| 52 || May 18 || at Arizona || Jerry Kindall Field at Frank Sancet Stadium • Tucson, Arizona || 8–5 || 31–19–2 || 12–8
|- align="center" bgcolor="#ffcccc"
| 53 || May 19 || at Arizona || Jerry Kindall Field at Frank Sancet Stadium • Tucson, Arizona || 11–15 || 31–20–2 || 12–9
|- align="center" bgcolor="#ccffcc"
| 54 || May 23 || at  || Husky Ballpark • Seattle, Washington || 9–4 || 32–20–2 || 13–9
|- align="center" bgcolor="#ccffcc"
| 55 || May 24 || at Washington || Husky Ballpark • Seattle, Washington || 8–5 || 33–20–2 || 14–9
|- align="center" bgcolor="#ffcccc"
| 56 || May 25 || at Washington || Husky Ballpark • Seattle, Washington || 4–7 || 33–21–2 || 14–10
|-

|-
|-
! style="" | Postseason
|- valign="top"

|- align="center" bgcolor="#ffcccc"
| 57 || May 30 || UC Davis || Sunken Diamond • Stanford, California || 2–4 || 33–22–2 || 14–10
|- align="center" bgcolor="#ccffcc"
| 58 || May 31 ||  || Sunken Diamond • Stanford, California || 5–1 || 34–22–2 || 14–10
|- align="center" bgcolor="#ccffcc"
| 59 || June 1 || UC Davis || Sunken Diamond • Stanford, California || 8–4 || 35–22–2 || 14–10
|- align="center" bgcolor="#ccffcc"
| 60 || June 1 ||  || Sunken Diamond • Stanford, California || 13–1 || 36–22–2 || 14–10
|- align="center" bgcolor="#ccffcc"
| 61 || June 2 || Pepperdine || Sunken Diamond • Stanford, California || 9–7 || 37–22–2 || 14–10
|-

|- align="center" bgcolor="#ccffcc"
| 62 || June 6 || at Cal State Fullerton || Goodwin Field • Fullerton, California || 4–3 || 38–22–2 || 14–10
|- align="center" bgcolor="#ccffcc"
| 63 || June 7 || at Cal State Fullerton || Goodwin Field • Fullerton, California || 8–5 || 39–22–2 || 14–10
|-

|- align="center" bgcolor="#ccffcc"
| 64 || June 14 || vs Florida State || Johnny Rosenblatt Stadium • Omaha, Nebraska || 16–5 || 40–22–2 || 14–10
|- align="center" bgcolor="#ffcccc"
| 65 || June 16 || vs Georgia || Johnny Rosenblatt Stadium • Omaha, Nebraska || 3–4 || 40–23–2 || 14–10
|- align="center" bgcolor="#ccffcc"
| 66 || June 18 || vs Miami (FL) || Johnny Rosenblatt Stadium • Omaha, Nebraska || 8–3 || 41–23–2 || 14–10
|- align="center" bgcolor="#ffcccc"
| 67 || June 21 || vs Georgia || Johnny Rosenblatt Stadium • Omaha, Nebraska || 8–10 || 41–24–2 || 14–10
|-

Awards and honors 
Jason Castro
 All-Pac-10 Conference
 Third Team All-American National Collegiate Baseball Writers Association
 College World Series All-Tournament Team

Erik Davis
 All-Pac-10 Conference

Brent Milleville
 Honorable Mention All-Pac-10 Conference

Randy Molina
 All-Pac-10 Conference

Cord Phelps
 All-Pac-10 Conference

Sean Ratliff
 All-Pac-10 Conference

Drew Storen
 All-Pac-10 Conference
 First Team Freshman All-American Collegiate Baseball

Austin Yount
 Honorable Mention All-Pac-10 Conference

References 

Stanford Cardinal baseball seasons
Stanford Cardinal baseball
College World Series seasons
Stanford